Immaculate Machine was a Canadian indie pop band from Victoria, British Columbia, active from 2003 to 2011.

The band's name is taken from the lyrics of "One-Trick Pony" from the album One-Trick Pony by Paul Simon.

History
Immaculate Machine was a trio in 2003 consisting of Brooke Gallupe, Kathryn Calder and Luke Kozlowski.  The band released The View and Transporter independently before signing to label Mint Records in early 2005.

Their Mint Records debut, Ones and Zeros, came out on September 6, 2005, and they supported the album with a tour of Canada and the United States. That year, Calder became a member of The New Pornographers, appearing on the album Twin Cinema and touring with the band. She is the niece of New Pornographers leader A.C. Newman.

In early June 2007, the band's song "Jarhand", the first single from their third album Immaculate Machine's Fables, was featured as the iTunes free single of the week.

In 2009, Kozlowski left the band and was replaced by Aden Collinge. 
As well, due to family commitments, Calder was unable to tour the band's latest album, High on Jackson Hill. To compensate for this, a touring band was formed consisting of Caitlin Gallupe, Brooke's sister, Jordan Minkoff, bandmate of Caitlin in Slam Dunk, and occasionally Leslie Rewega.

Members
Brooke Gallupe (2003–2011)
Kathryn Calder (2003–2011)
Luke Kozlowski (2003–2009)
Aden Collinge (2009–2011)
Caitlin Gallupe (2009–2011)
Jordan Minkoff (2009–2011)
Leslie Rewega (2009–2011)

Discography

Singles
 Won't Be Pretty (7" single) (2008)

EPs
 The View (2003)
 Les Uns Mais Pas Les Autres (2006)

Albums
 Transporter (2004)
 Ones and Zeros (2005)
 Immaculate Machine's Fables (2007)
 High on Jackson Hill (2009)

See also

Canadian rock
List of Canadian musicians
List of bands from Canada
List of bands from British Columbia

References

External links
Immaculate Machine

Musical groups established in 2003
Canadian indie rock groups
Canadian indie pop groups
Musical groups from Victoria, British Columbia
Mint Records artists
2003 establishments in British Columbia
Musical groups disestablished in 2011
2011 disestablishments in British Columbia